Gino Sensani (1888–1947) was an Italian costume designer who worked on over eighty films during his career.

Selected filmography
 Loyalty of Love (1934)
 Naples of Former Days (1938)
 Kean (1940)
 Beatrice Cenci (1941)
 Pirates of Malaya (1941)
 The Countess of Castiglione (1942)
 Flesh Will Surrender (1947)
 The Brothers Karamazov (1947)
 Daniele Cortis (1947)

References

Bibliography
 Reich, Jacqueline & Garofalo, Piero. Re-viewing Fascism: Italian Cinema, 1922-1943. Indiana University Press, 2002.

External links

1888 births
1947 deaths
Italian costume designers
People from the Province of Siena